Drago Pudgar (born 27 September 1949) is a Slovenian ski jumper. He competed in the normal hill and large hill events at the 1972 Winter Olympics.

References

1949 births
Living people
Slovenian male ski jumpers
Olympic ski jumpers of Yugoslavia
Ski jumpers at the 1972 Winter Olympics
People from the Municipality of Črna na Koroškem